GT4 or GT-Four may refer to:

Automotive
 GT4 European Series, a sports car championship
 Ferrari GT4
 Porsche Cayman GT4
 Porsche 981 Cayman GT4
 Porsche 718 Cayman GT4
 Toyota Celica GT-Four

Other uses
 Gran Turismo 4, a racing video game
 GT4 (tram), a design of articulated tram which has two bogies and two body sections, and specifically:
 GT4 (Bremen), a model of GT4 tram used in the German city of Bremen
 Maschinenfabrik Esslingen GT4, a model of GT4 tram used in Stuttgart and other German cities